The Amman Citadel is an archeological site at the center of downtown Amman, the capital of Jordan. The L-shaped hill is one of the seven hills (jabals) that originally made up Amman.

The Citadel has a long history of occupation by many great civilizations. Evidence of inhabitance since the Neolithic period has been found and the hill was fortified during the Bronze Age (1800 BCE). The hill became the capital of the Kingdom of Ammon sometime after 1200 BCE. It later came under the sway of empires such as the Neo-Assyrian Empire (8th century BCE), Neo-Babylonian Empire (6th century BC), the Ptolemies, the Seleucids (3rd century BCE), Romans (1st century BCE), Byzantines (3rd century CE) and the Umayyads (7th century CE). After the Umayyads, came a period of decline and for much of the time until 1878 as the former city became an abandoned pile of ruins only sporadically used by Bedouins and seasonal farmers. Despite this gap, the Citadel of Amman is considered to be among the world's oldest continuously inhabited places.

Most of the structures still visible at the site are from the Roman, Byzantine, and Umayyad periods. The major remains at the site are the Temple of Hercules, a Byzantine church, and the Umayyad Palace. The Jordan Archaeological Museum was built on the hill in 1951. Though the fortification walls enclose the heart of the site, the ancient periods of occupation covered large areas. Historic structures, tombs, arches, walls and stairs have no modern borders, and therefore there is considerable archaeological potential at this site, as well as in surrounding lands, and throughout Amman. Archaeologists have been working at the site since the 1920s, including Italian, British, French, Spanish, and Jordanian projects, but a great part of the Citadel remains unexcavated.

History
Excavations have uncovered signs of human occupation from as far back as the Middle Bronze Age (1650-1550 BCE) in the form of a tomb that held pottery and scarab seals. During the Iron Age, the Citadel was the site of the capital of the Ammonites, which was known as "Rabbah" or "Rabbath Ammon". The Amman Citadel Inscription comes from this period, and is considered to be the oldest known inscription in the Ammonite language, written in the Phoenician Alphabet. From the Hellenistic Period, there were not many architectural changes, but pottery provides evidence for their occupation. The site became Roman around 30 BCE, and eventually came under Muslim rule in 661 CE. The Citadel declined in importance under Ayyubid rule in the 13th century, but a watchtower was added to the site during this period.

Main structures
The Roman Temple of Hercules
The Umayyad Palace, mosque, and water cistern 
The Byzantine church (ESE of the Umayyad mosque)
The Ayyubid watchtower

Temple of Hercules
The Temple of Hercules dates to the Roman period in the 2nd century CE.

Umayyad palace and mosque
During the Umayyad period (AD 661-750), a palace structure, known in Arabic as al-Qasr (القصر), was built at the Citadel. The Umayyad Palace was probably used as an administrative building or the residence of an Umayyad official. The palace draws on Byzantine architectural patterns. For example, the entrance hall is built in the shape of a Greek cross. The palace may have been built on top of an existing Byzantine structure in this shape. There is a huge water reservoir dug into the ground adjacent to the palace.

The Amman Citadel Mosque is an example of early mosques that imitated the Persian-style apadana hall, characterised by a "forest of columns"; these mosques are normally found only in Persia and Mesopotamia (Iraq).

Tourism
Starting in 1995-6, the Ministry of Tourism and Antiquities of Jordan in partnership with USAID began a project to conserve and restore this site to benefit tourists and the local community. The Amman Citadel is also the site of Jordan Archaeological Museum, which is home to a collection of artifacts from the Citadel and other Jordanian historic sites.

References

External links

Buildings and structures in Amman
Archaeological sites in Jordan
Tourist attractions in Amman
Tells (archaeology)